The Bohle River is a river located in North Queensland, Australia.

Course and features

The Hervey Range Developmental Road crosses the river east of Thuringowa and then the Ingham Connection Road crosses the river west of Townsville. It then enters the Bohle River Fish Habitat Area and the Townsville Town Common Conservation Park and discharges into the Halifax Bay near Bushland Beach, and then empties into the Coral Sea. Tributaries include Middle Creek, Stony Creek, Stag Creek, the Little Bohle River and Garner Creek. The river descends  over its  course.

The river drains most of the coastal plain west of Townsville.

The river supports recreational fishing, particularly of barramundi. Popular for river fishing, the Bohle River is also good for collecting bait. Yabbies are found from time to time in the muddy banks. Typical fish species found in the river are barramundi, red bream, mangrove jack and grunter.

The rivers is named after the drover Henry Mackinnon Bohle who worked for a pioneer of the area John Melton Black. Bohle overlanded a mob of cattle to Fanning Downs in 1863 and moved stock to the Cleveland Bay area in 1864 for Black.

See also

References

External links

 2001 Thuringowa Council: Bohle River Floodplain Management Study

Rivers of Queensland
North Queensland
Bodies of water of the Coral Sea